Ligota Tułowicka  is a village in the administrative district of Gmina Tułowice, within Opole County, Opole Voivodeship, and in south-western Poland.

References 

Villages in Opole County